Brazil–Pakistan relations refers to bilateral relations between Brazil and  Pakistan. Brazil maintains an embassy in Islamabad and Pakistan maintains an embassy in Brasília.

In 2009, Brazil approved the sale of 100 MAR-1 anti-radiation missiles to Pakistan despite India's pressure on Brazil not to do so.

Brazil's Defense Minister Nelson Jobim called these missiles "very effective ways to monitor" areas flown by war planes, and said the deal with Pakistan was worth 85 million euros (167.6 million dollars).
He dismissed protests by India. "Brazil negotiates with Pakistan, not with terrorists," Mr Jobim said. "To cancel this deal would be to attribute terrorist activities to the Pakistani Government."

At the United Nations, India found itself in the dock at a meeting of the Intergovernmental Negotiations on Security Council reform when Pakistan and other delegates demanded some rationale for its bid. Brazil, Germany and Japan also supported Pakistan's stance for permanent membership of the fifteen members body.

Bilateral trade agreement between Pakistan and Brazil is in operation since 1982. Brazil is interested to improve trade volume with Pakistan. Currently Brazil-Pakistan Chamber of Commerce is established in Brazil and its current president is Munawar Iqbal.

Brazil supports the development of Pakistan's agriculture sector. Brazil having advanced agriculture technologies is helping Pakistan to develop its agriculture sector.

Pakistani students that are finishing their college can apply for an opportunity of having their University studies done in Brazil, with tuition costs covered by the Brazilian Government, through the Program for Exchange Students – Undergraduate (PEC-G). This Program has been in place since 2012.

Brazil is one of football leading team in the world. Pakistan-made Brazuca soccer ball was used in 2014 Football world cup. Die-hard Pakistani Football Fans Supported Brazilian Soccer Team in World Cup 2014.

See also
Foreign relations of Pakistan
Foreign relations of Brazil

References

External links
Ministry of Foreign Relations of Brazil
Ministry of Foreign Affairs of Pakistan
Embassy of Pakistan in Brazil
Embassy of Brazil in Pakistan

 
Pakistan
Bilateral relations of Pakistan